The Wayland Town Crier is a paid weekly, local newspaper in Wayland, Massachusetts. It is currently owned by GateHouse Media and operated underneath the Wicked Local branch.

History
The earliest found issue of the Crier is Vol. 6, No. 1 from October 1951.

The paper was published monthly until 1955, mainly discussing news of the town and the surrounding areas. Following the final publication of Vol. 9, the paper began publishing weekly, starting with Vol. 10, No. 1 on September 29, 1955. Since this date, the Crier has published between 51 and 53 newspapers every year. All publications are released on Thursdays.

References

External links

 

Gannett publications
Weekly newspapers published in the United States
Newspapers published in Massachusetts
1951 establishments in Massachusetts
Publications established in 1951